Bonn-Oberkassel station is on the East Rhine Railway in the suburb of Oberkassel in the Bonn district of Beuel in the German state of North Rhine-Westphalia.

History 
The station was opened on 11 July 1870 in the course of extending the East Rhine line from Neuwied to Oberkassel and at the same time as the establishment of the Bonn–Oberkassel train ferry.

After the closure of the train ferry in 1919, the station retained its function, since it continued to handle the freight of a cement factory. In addition, it was used by a shipyard newly established in the train ferry precinct.

With the decline and final closing down of the cement factory in 1987, the station's freight facilities (several sidings and loading ramps) also lost their importance. Today, of the formerly large field of railway tracks at the station only the two tracks on the East Rhine line are used for freight and commuter trains. The remaining tracks were removed in 2008 along with the overhead line equipment. The historic station building is a heritage listed building and is used as a private residence and for offices and a restaurant.

Passenger services
The station is classified  by Deutsche Bahn as a category 5 station. It is served hourly by Regional-Express service RE 8 (Rhein-Erft-Express) and Regionalbahn service RB 27 (Rhein-Erft-Bahn), which complement each another to provide an approximate half-hourly service. Near the railway station is the Oberkassel Nord tram and Stadtbahn station, which provides a connection to Bonn Hauptbahnhof.

Planning 
The planned extension of S-Bahn line 13 from Troisdorf to Oberkassel (connecting to Cologne/Bonn Airport at 20-minute intervals) will increase the importance of the station. This plan requires the construction of additional tracks and a turn-back facility for S-Bahn trains, involving extensive work.  According to Deutsche Bahn's plans, construction is to begin in early 2017. Since the trains of the East Rhine railway are planned to run on schedule during the construction period, a construction period of twelve years is estimated. The route is due to be finished at the end of 2028. On the section between Troisdorf and Bonn-Beuel, S-Bahn services are planned to commence at the end of 2026.

Notes

Railway stations in Bonn
Railway stations in Germany opened in 1870